Small Chambermusicians is the second release by the German industrial music project Wumpscut.

Summary

Small Chambermusicians appeared in two different editions, the only difference being that the second's cover art was changed to black and white. Many of these songs can be found on later Wumpscut compilation albums.

Track listing
Side One

 "Crucified" – 3:59
 "Josef Zech Groove" – 4:04
 "Move Encharge" – 2:39
 "Stomp" – 2:19
 "Tschüsch Domos" – 3:16
 "Cry Weisenstein Cry" – 4:29
 "Lamandier" – 1:37

Side Two

 "Neolithic Heartbeat" – 4:22
 "Tempus Fugit" – 3:03
 "Jesus Gone" – 10:49
 "Irak1 (A Tribute to Ernst Horn)" – 4:10

External links
Official homepage
Fan page with detailed information

Wumpscut albums
1991 albums